Stoked (stylized as Stōked) is a Canadian animated series produced by Fresh TV that premiered on Teletoon on June 25, 2009 and ended on January 26, 2013. It aired on Teletoon in Canada, ABC3 in Australia and on Cartoon Network in the U.S. The series is from the same creators as 6teen and the Total Drama series.

Plot
Stoked is a character-driven animated situational comedy about a group of groms who come together one summer on the legendary Surfer's Paradise Hotel in British Columbia to experience the ultimate surfer's dream — the endless summer. Emma, Reef and Fin join locals Broseph, Lo, her brothers Ty and George, and Johnny to work at the world-renowned Surfer's Paradise Ridgemount Resort, stoked to have the best summer of their lives. But instead they find  the worst jobs ever, hideous uniforms, zero respect, a run-down staff house, and a tacky, fake, kooksville resort. For twelve weeks, they will spend their first summer away from home and work the hardest that they have ever worked in their lives, but most importantly, they have the opportunity to surf on their days off.

Episodes

Characters

Main
Reef: The new surf instructor of the resort, he has dreamed of going to Sunset Beach all of his life and finally made it. He wiped out once and slammed his jaw into a reef earning his nickname. Reef is voiced by Jeff Geddis.
Fin McCloud: She is the ultimate surfer girl: tough, enjoyable and laid back. She is totally into girl power, which is something she and Reef argue frequently about. A running gag is her proficiency for belching. Fin is voiced by Katie Crown.
Emma: She is from Calgary, Alberta, and before coming to Sunset Beach she had never surfed before. She was intent on surfing as soon as she saw a surf movie with her older brothers. Emma is voiced by Kristin Fairlie.
Broseph: He is a chilled-out local surfer, with wisdom that is never seen by many and is a loyal friend. Broseph's voice actor is Mazin Elsadig.
Lauren "Lo" Ridgemount: She is the daughter of the resort's owner. Lo's life has been being spoiled, but is forced to work at the resort by her father after throwing a massive party. She loves shopping and surfing. She is voiced by Anastasia Phillips.
Johnny: He works at the front desk of the hotel. Johnny is voiced by Arnold Pinnock.

Supporting
Andrew "Bummer" Baumer: The day manager of the resort, he is stern and illiberal with the workers below him. He is voiced by Cory Doran.
Tyler "Ty" Ridgemount: Lo's older brother who also surfs, and Emma has a crush on. Ty is voiced by Jamie Spilchuk.
George Ridgemount: Lo and Ty's 12-year-old younger brother. He is voiced by Gage Munroe.
Grommet: Grommet only appeared in a few episodes. He is Broseph's younger brother and is actually with George, being best friends.
Ripper: An Australian friend of the group and a soul surfer. Ripper is voiced by Sergio Di Zio.
"No Pants" Lance: He is another of the returning staff and Ripper's best friend. He is voiced by Cory Doran.
Kelly: A bossy, selfish, snobbish, and possibly sadistic girl who leads the staff seniors in their harassment and intimidation towards the groms. She is voiced by Lauren Lipson.
Rosie: She is a maid at Surfer's Paradise. She is voiced by Fiona Reid.
Snack Shack:  An overweight employee at Surfer's Paradise Ridgemount Resort. He works at the "Snack Shack" at the hotel pool. He also works part time at a bakery in Sunset Beach that sells Beaver Tails. He is voiced by Darren Frost.
Wipeout: Dressed in a purple orca costume, Wipeout poses as the resort's mascot, carrying around a portable stereo and dancing to greet visitors. He is voiced by Sergio Di Zio.
Mr. Ridgemount: He is the owner of the resort and is the head of the Ridgemount Hotel chain of which Surfer's Paradise is the flagship property. His face is never shown onscreen. He is voiced by Jamie Watson.
Mrs. Ridgemount: She is Lo, Ty and George's mother and a stereotypical trophy wife, although in a mid-life crisis. She is voiced by Emilie-Claire Barlow.
The Kahuna: He is a very friendly person whose laid back personality resembles that of a flower child. He is voiced by Jamie Watson.
Mark and Todd Marvin: Twin brothers who are guests at the resort and they are rambunctious children who get on everyone's nerves.
Mr. & Mrs. Marvin: They are the parents of Mark and Todd, who frequently allow their children to run wild and engage in destructive behavior in the hotel. Voiced by Terry McGurrin and Katie Crown.
Sonny and Buster: A shark and a yellow tang who are two fish that reside in the Lobbyquarium. Buster is friendly and dimwitted, although he tries to be non-violent, and can have a mean streak. Sonny speaks with a New York accent, and makes bets with other fish in the aquarium.

Telecast and home media
Stoked premiered on Teletoon on June 25, 2009 with the final episode aired on January 26, 2013. It aired on Teletoon with repeats until the mid-2010s, ABC3 in Australia and on Cartoon Network in the U.S. In the 2010s, the show has been released on DVD by Phase 4's KaBoom!. Season one was made available for purchase on Apple TV.

References

External links

 
 Fin McCloud on Twitter

2009 Canadian television series debuts
2013 Canadian television series endings
2000s Canadian animated television series
2000s Canadian workplace comedy television series
2010s Canadian animated television series
2010s Canadian workplace comedy television series
Canadian children's animated comedy television series
Canadian flash animated television series
English-language television shows
Surfing mass media
Teen animated television series
Teletoon original programming
Television series about vacationing
Television series by Fresh TV
Television shows set in British Columbia
Television shows filmed in Toronto